Konstantinou or Constantinou or Kostandinou is a Greek surname, the genitive form of "Constantine". It is a common name in Greece and Cyprus.

Surname
Notable people with surname Konstantinou:

Alex Konstantinou (born 1992), Cypriot footballer
Andreas Constantinou (born 1980), Cypriot footballer
Chris Constantinou, English musician
Clay Constantinou (born 1951), American diplomat
Fivos Constantinou (born 1981), Cypriot distance runner
Giorgos Konstantinou (born 1934), Greek actor and director
Konstantinos Konstantinou (cyclist), Greek cyclist
Michalis Konstantinou (born 1978), Cypriot footballer
Stavros Konstantinou (born 1984), Cypriot singer
Vasilis Konstantinou (born 1947), Greek footballer

Culture
Konstantinou kai Elenis, Greek sitcom

Greek-language surnames
Surnames
Patronymic surnames
Surnames from given names